Len Olson (born October 30, 1968), better known by the ring names Dr. Luther or simply Luther, is a Canadian professional wrestler signed to All Elite Wrestling, where he is also a producer. He is also known for his appearances in Japan for Frontier Martial-Arts Wrestling, WAR, and IWA Japan in the 1990s. Olson has also appeared in numerous promotions throughout the Canadian independent circuit in the 1990s and 2000s.

Professional wrestling career

Early career (1988–1992) 
Olson was born and raised in Calgary, and was brought up with Stampede Wrestling. He was trained by Keith Hart in the Hart Dungeon. On April 12, 1991, Olson lost to Chris Jericho in CNWA. He continued to fight in Calgary until 1992.

Frontier Martial-Arts Wrestling (1992–1994) 
In 1992, Olson was invited on a tour of Japan with the Frontier Martial-Arts Wrestling promotion. Told to develop a character for himself, Olson donned a straitjacket and face mask and adopted the ring name "Dr. Luther". As Dr. Luther, Olson would throw chairs and run into the audience, quickly becoming a popular and feared wrestler.

Olson teamed with Dr. Hannibal (Steve Gillespie). He feuded with many Japanese like Tarzan Goto, Hayabusa, Mr. Gannosuke and Atsushi Onita. He feuded with other wrestlers such as Sabu, The Sheik and Mike Awesome, who was known as the Gladiator. In February 1993, he and Dr. Hannibal joined the original Team Canada, which included The Gladiator, Big Titan, and Ricky Fuji.

In 1992, Olson held the AWA World Light Heavyweight Championship.

On May 5, 1993, Dr. Luther and Hannibal Lector (Dr. Hannibal) lost to Sabu and Sabu's uncle The Sheik.
By 1994, Olson left Japan and wrestled in various promotions. In 2001 he returned to FMW and won the tag team titles with Biomonster DNA.

WAR and IWA Japan (1995–1997) 
In July 1995, Olson appeared with the Japanese promotion WAR. He returned to the promotion in March 1996, regularly teaming with Big Titan.

He returned to Japan in 1996 and teamed with Freddie Krueger until 1997.

ECW and WCW (1998, 2000) 
In August 1998 Dr. Luther competed in two matches for Extreme Championship Wrestling losing to Mike Awesome and Tommy Rogers.

On August 26, 2000, Olson was on World Championship Wrestling's WCW Worldwide as Mad Jack losing to Vampiro.

Independent circuit (1997–2020) 
In 1998 Dr. Luther made his debut in Elite Canadian Championship Wrestling (ECCW) based in British Columbia. In April 2000 he lost to Kurrgan. On November 23, 2000, Luther won the ECCW Heavyweight title by defeating The Juggernaut. He held the title for 373 days until losing it to Chance Beckett on December 1, 2001. During the title reign, Luther retained his titles by defeating Sabu, Tommy Dreamer and Christopher Daniels. He left in 2002.

After ECCW Luther left the company in 2002 and went to other independents. He stopped in Portland, Oregon, wrestling for Portland Wrestling. He lost to Raven on September 3, 2004. His last feud was with Skag Rollins. 

In 2009 he wrestled in Marysville, Washington. In 2011 he wrestled in Hollywood as Father Dante. In 2016 Dr. Luther returned to wrestling in ECCW.

All Elite Wrestling (2020–present) 
Dr. Luther began working with All Elite Wrestling in late 2019. On the January 8, 2020 edition of Dynamite, Luther made his first television appearance during a match for the AEW Women's World Championship between Riho and Kris Statlander as the fourth member of the heel Nightmare Collective stable (which consisted of Awesome Kong, Brandi Rhodes, and Mel). However, the angle was badly received by fans and was dropped in February after Kong left the promotion to film the final season of GLOW. Luther made his in ring debut for the promotion on the February 28th edition of AEW Dark in a winning effort against Sonny Kiss. On March 11, Olson was officially signed to a contract with AEW as both a performer and working in an unspecified role in the AEW office.  Luther would then form the Chaos Project tag team with Serpentico on AEW Dark, where they developed a winning streak. On the September 30 episode of Dynamite, Luther and Serpentico attacked Chris Jericho and Jake Hager after Jericho provoked Luther thus setting up a match for the following week. The following week on Jericho's 30 year anniversary show, Luther and Serpentico in their debut match on Dynamite were defeated by Jericho and Hager.

Championships and accomplishments 
Canadian Rocky Mountain Wrestling
CRMW Mid-Heavyweight Championship (2 times)	 
DOA Pro Wrestling
DOA Heavyweight Championship (1 time)	 
Elite Canadian Championship Wrestling
ECCW Championship (1 time) 
ECCW Tag Team Championship (3 times) – with Incubus (2) and Juggernaut (1) 
Frontier Martial-Arts Wrestling
AWA World Light Heavyweight Championship (1 time)	
Indigenous Wrestling Alliance
IWA Heavyweight Championship (1 time)	 
North American Wrestling
NAW Heavyweight Championship (2 times)	 
West Coast Championship Wrestling
WCCW Heavyweight Championship	(1 time)	 
Western Canada Extreme Wrestling
WCEW Tag Team Championship (1 time) – with Juggernaut

References

External links 

1968 births
20th-century professional wrestlers
21st-century professional wrestlers
All Elite Wrestling personnel
Canadian expatriate professional wrestlers in the United States
Canadian male professional wrestlers
Canadian podcasters
Canadian YouTubers
Expatriate professional wrestlers in Japan
Living people
Professional wrestlers from Calgary
Canadian expatriate sportspeople in Japan
AWA World Light Heavyweight Champions